Sybra biochreopunctipennis is a species of beetle in the family Cerambycidae. It was described by Breuning in 1966.

References

biochreopunctipennis
Beetles described in 1966